"We Don't Believe What's on TV" is a song by American musical duo Twenty One Pilots. The song was recorded by the band for their fourth studio album, Blurryface, and was also released as a promotional single. The song appears on the soundtrack of the film Power Rangers (2017). It was written by Twenty One Pilots frontman Tyler Joseph. The song also peaked at No. 36 on the US Hot Rock Songs chart.

Composition 
"We Don't Believe What's on TV" is an indie rock song that lasts for a duration of two minutes and fifty-seven seconds. According to the sheet music published at Musicnotes.com by Alfred Publishing Co., Inc, it is composed in the key of A Major and set in the time signature of common time, with a tempo of 120 beats per minute.

Charts

Weekly charts

Year-end charts

Certifications

References

Twenty One Pilots songs
Songs written by Tyler Joseph
2015 songs